Area 27 can refer to:

 Brodmann area 27
 Area 27 (Nevada National Security Site)
 Area 27 - Road Race Track - Oliver, British Columbia, Canada